USS Phillips (SP-1389), later USS SP-1389, was a tug that served in the United States Navy as a patrol vessel during World War I.

Phillips was a steam-powered tug built in 1901 by William R. Osborn at Croton, New York. During the period of American participation in World War I, the U.S. Navy acquired her under charter from the Commonwealth of Virginia and placed her in commission as USS Phillips (SP-1389).

Phillips performed patrol duties based at Norfolk, Virginia, during the war, at some point being renamed USS SP-1389.

SP-1389 was returned to her owner on 22 October 1918.

References

NavSource Online: Section Patrol Craft Photo Archive SP-1389 ex-Phillips (SP 1389)

Patrol vessels of the United States Navy
World War I patrol vessels of the United States
Ships built in New York (state)
1901 ships